This is a list of notable players for FC Spartak Moscow. It includes the players who made at least 50 league appearances for the club or scored at least 5 league goals.

Figures and dates are for the league competitions only (Soviet Top League, Soviet First League and Russian Premier League). Appearances and goals in the games which were awarded to one team after the fact (or in the unfinished 1941 Soviet Top League) are included.

For a list of all Spartak players with a Wikipedia article, see :Category:FC Spartak Moscow players.

Players
 (end of the 2009 season).

 
Spartak Moscow players
FC Spartak Moscow
FC Spartak Moscow
Association football player non-biographical articles